Angresse is a commune of the Landes department in Nouvelle-Aquitaine in southwestern France.

Population

Notable residents
 Jessika Ponchet (born 1996) professional tennis player.

See also
Communes of the Landes department

References

Communes of Landes (department)